South Lebanon conflict may refer to:
1978 South Lebanon conflict
South Lebanon conflict (1985–2000)
2006 Lebanon War